Giants Ridge is a ski area, which hosts a collection of ski and snowboard trails, located along Wynne Lake in the middle of St. Louis County, east of Biwabik, Minnesota in the United States.

History 
In 1959, the main hill was cut consisting of one complete run on the west side of the road and a single-line rope tow. The chalet was a structure purchased from Erie Mining Co. This building was converted from the Evergreen Trailer Court into a warm-up building.  After being closed for several years in the late 1970s and early 1980s, the IRRRB purchased the property from the bank, which satisfied an earlier federal Small Business Administration loan. In 1984, the IRRRB provided an original financial commitment of $6 million to $7 million to create a Nordic training facility and an alpine skiing complex.

Location 

Giants Ridge is located in Minnesota's Iron Range, in St. Louis County, east of Biwabik, Minnesota in the United States.

Ski runs and terrain 
There are  skiable at Giants Ridge.  The ski hill has  of vertical drop. Giants Ridge often uses artificial snow for maintaining the slopes.  There are 35 trails with 7 chairlifts.  There are two chalets, the Burnt Onion Chalet and the South Chalet. There is also a yurt, restaurant, grill, and a hotel. During the summer, Giants Ridge operates two golf courses, the 18 hole Legends course, and the 9 hole Quarry.

Activities

The following are activities included at Giants Ridge: 

 Alpine skiing
 Night skiing
 Snowboarding
 Nordic skiing
 Snow tubing
 Snowshoeing
 Fat tire biking
 Adaptive skiing
 Golf

External links
 Giants Ridge Homepage

References

Ski areas and resorts in Minnesota
Buildings and structures in St. Louis County, Minnesota
Tourist attractions in St. Louis County, Minnesota